Kodi Taehyun Lee (born July 7, 1996) is a Korean American singer-songwriter and pianist. He rose to fame after participating in, and ultimately winning, the 14th season of America's Got Talent.

In 2019, Lee auditioned for AGT, and within weeks his performance had over 50 million views on the internet. At the end of the season, he was declared the winner.

Early life 
Kodi Lee was born with optic nerve hypoplasia, causing him to become legally blind. He was also diagnosed with autism at an early age, and has Addison's disease. Lee is a prodigious musical savant, a person who manifests musical abilities that would be considered extraordinary, even in a person who is not autistic.

America's Got Talent 
On May 28, 2019, Lee auditioned for America's Got Talent during season 14. He performed Leon Russell's song, "A Song for You". Judges Howie Mandel, Gabrielle Union, Julianne Hough and Simon Cowell and the audience gave him a standing ovation at the end of the performance. Union pressed the Golden Buzzer for him, sending him straight through to the live shows. At the quarterfinals, Lee performed Simon and Garfunkel's "Bridge over Troubled Water" (again to a standing ovation), and advanced to the semifinals. In the semifinals, Lee performed "You Are the Reason" by Calum Scott. During the results, he was announced as one of the ten finalists for the season. In the finals, he performed "Lost Without You" by Freya Ridings. In the finale that aired on September 18, 2019, he performed "You Are the Reason" again, with special guest Leona Lewis. At the end of the program, Lee was announced the winner of season 14, having received the most votes. He is the first autistic, and developmentally disabled person, to win the show.

In July 2022, Cowell ranked his favorite Top 15 Golden Buzzer moments in AGT history during season 17, on which Lee placed 3rd.

In August 2022, Kodi performed a duet of "Don't Stop Believin'" with Teddy Swims along with guitarist Neal Schon, the founder of the band Journey, during the AGT Qualifiers 3 Results episode.

In January 2023, Kodi and Colin Hay released “Hello World” on January 2, 2023. This song got rave reviews and has been well received. This song is Kodi's second original release, preceded by his first, “Miracle.” A lyric video of "Hello World" is coming.

In 2023, Kodi participated in America's Got Talent: All-Stars. He received more votes than season 15 winner Brandon Leake and comedian Josh Blue, advancing him to the finale.

References 

1996 births
Living people
21st-century American singers
21st-century American pianists
American male singer-songwriters
Blind musicians
Autistic savants
America's Got Talent winners
Singer-songwriters from California
American musicians of Korean descent
People on the autism spectrum
21st-century American male singers